John Ellis may refer to:

Academics
John Ellis (scrivener) (1698–1791), English political writer
John Ellis (naturalist) (1710–1776), English botanical illustrator
John Ellis (physicist, born 1946), British theoretical physicist at CERN
John Millott Ellis (1831–1894), abolitionist and President of Oberlin College
R. John Ellis (born 1935), British biochemist
Sir John Ellis (physician) (1916–1998), Dean London Hospital Medical College 1968–1980 medical educationalist
John Ellis (media academic) (born 1952), British media theorist and TV producer
John Ellis (physicist, born 1963), British physicist at the University of Cambridge

Business
Alfred John Ellis (1915–2020), Canadian banker
John Ellis (businessman) (1789–1862), Director of the Midland Railway in the UK and MP for Leicester 1848–1852
John Devonshire Ellis (1824–1906), English steelmaker
John Prescott Ellis (born 1953), media consultant and first cousin of U.S. President George W. Bush
Dr. John Ellis (Valvoline founder) (1815–1896), founder of the motor oil company, Valvoline

Music
John Ellis (guitarist) (born 1952), founding member of the 1970s punk band The Vibrators
John Ellis (saxophonist) (born 1974), New Orleans jazz musician
John Ellis, member of the South African band Tree63

Politics
John Ellis (MP for New Romney)
John Ellis (Harwich MP) (1643–1738), English administrator and MP for Harwich 1702–08
John Ellis (Newry MP) (1812–?), Irish Member of UK Parliament for Newry
Sir John Whittaker Ellis (1829–1912), British Member of Parliament for Mid Surrey 1884–1885, Kingston 1885–1892
John Ellis (Fianna Fáil politician) (born 1952), Irish Fianna Fáil politician
John Ellis (Liberal politician) (1841–1910), British Liberal politician, MP for Rushcliffe 1885–1910
John Ellis (pastoralist) (1803–1873), "Captain Ellis" South Australian grazier and MLC
John Ellis (Australian politician) (1872–1945), Victorian state politician
John Ellis (Labour politician) (1930–2019), British Labour Party politician, MP for Bristol North West and for Brigg and Scunthorpe
John Valentine Ellis (1835–1913), Canadian MP and Senator
John William Ellis (1853–1918), New Zealand businessman and mayor of Hamilton
John Willis Ellis (1820–1861), North Carolina governor
E. John Ellis (1840–1889), U.S. Representative from Louisiana
John Ellis Martineau (1873–1937), governor of Arkansas then United States District Court judge
Johnny Ellis (1960–2022), Democratic member of the Alaska Senate

Religion
John Ellis (theologian) (1606?–1681), English priest
John Ellis (antiquarian) (1634–1735), Welsh priest, rector of Llanbedr-y-Cennin
John Ellis (religious writer) (1598/99–1665), Welsh priest
John Tracy Ellis (1905–1992), Catholic Church historian
John Ellis (chaplain) (born 1963), Chaplain in Chief of the Royal Air Force

Sports

Cricket
John Ellis (English cricketer) (1864–1927), English cricketer
John Ellis (Victoria cricketer) (1890–1974), Australian cricketer
John Ellis (Queensland cricketer) (1914–1994), Australian cricketer

Other sports
John Ellis (baseball) (1948–2022), American baseball player
John Ellis (footballer) (born 1948), Australian rules footballer
John Ellis (golfer) (born 1979), American golfer
Jonathan Ellis (wrestler) (born 1982), British professional wrestler

Others
John Ellis (executioner) (1874–1932), British executioner
John Ellis (trade unionist) (1939–2011), British trade union leader
John G. Ellis, English architect
John R. Ellis, American visual effects artist
J. Breckenridge Ellis (1870–1956), American writer

See also
John Allis (born 1942), American cyclist
Jack Ellis (disambiguation)
John Ellys (1701–1757), English portrait-painter
John Ellys (Caius) (1634?–1716), English academic, Master of Gonville and Caius College, Cambridge from 1703
John Scott-Ellis, 9th Baron Howard de Walden (1912–1999), British peer, landowner, and thoroughbred racehorse owner and breeder